The National Axe Throwing Federation (NATF) is a global organization established in the United States in 2016 for the sport of axe throwing.

NATF has over 4,500 league members in over 55 cities and seven countries. Its leagues culminate in the National Axe Throwing Championship (NATC) to award the Wilson Cup and over $16,500 in prize money and charitable donation.

Scoring 

Scoring in axe-throwing includes a three-round match system where five axes are thrown per round. The first player to win two of three rounds wins. Scoring is determined by where on the target the axe strikes. 

The targets under NATF have a black bullseye ring, followed by a red ring, and then a blue ring. The scoring is 5, 3, and 1 point respectively. Additionally, there are green dots in the corner, known as “Clutch,” and must be called in advance during the final throw of a match (worth 7 points). Point designation is based on where the majority of the blade lands and sticks.

Current Member Organizations 

 ABQ Axe
Axe Club of America
Axe Factor Singapore
Axe Kickers
 Axe Nation
Axt Axe Throwing
 Backyard Axe Throwing League (BATL)
Bare Axe Throwing
 Bounce Milwaukee (Fling Milwaukee)
 Bullseye Axe Throwing
Chill Axe Throwing
 Chopper's Hatchet House
 Civil Axe Throwing
 Detroit Axe
 Flying Timber Axe Throwing
 Forged Axe Throwing
 Golden Axe Throw Club
 Half Axe
 Kraken Axes
LA AX
Axe Club of America
 LumberJaxes
 Maniax Axe Throwing
Mazhu Axes
 Meduseld Meadery
 Northern Axperts
 Peterborough Axe Club
Primitive Axe
 Rage Academy
 Riot Axe
 Timber Lounge Halifaxe
 Tomahawks Axe Throwing
Total Axe Throwing
 True North Axe Throwing
 UberWarrior Closed 
 Urban Axes
 Valhalla Indoor Axe Throwing
 Warriors Axe Throwing

National Axe Throwing Championship 
The axe throwing league calendar culminates at the National Axe Throwing Championship (NATC), where league players compete for the Wilson Cup. The NATC takes place in two stages of competition in January and February of each year.  The final stage takes place during the annual All-Star Weekend, together with other axe throwing events including the Winter Skillz competition and the Axe Prom dinner and awards ceremony.

Charitable Support 
The 2018 All-Star Weekend was presented by Beau's All Natural Brewing Co.  The NATC tournament helped to raise proceeds of $9,766.92 for donation to the Red Door Family Shelter.

NATC Winners 

Winners of the NATC are awarded the Wilson Cup, which is named after the NATF's Commissioner, Matt Wilson.  Wilson and some friends pioneered the sport in 2006.

 2017-19  Straun Riley - Backyard Axe Throwing League
 2016-17 Stefan Herda - Backyard Axe Throwing League

From 2012 - 2016 the National Axe Throwing Championship was known as the annual Champions League tournament for eligible competitors from the Backyard Axe Throwing League.  Past Champions League winners include:

 2013-16 Stefan Herda
 2012-13 Jari Salovaara
 2011-12 Dave Michna

NATF Competitive Regions  
The NATF consists of seven North American regions and one  International region to support local axe throwing competition.

History 
The National Axe Throwing Federation was founded in 2016 by Matt Wilson and COO, Brian Simmons, from BATL.

References

External links

Axe throwing
Lumberjack sports
Sports organizations established in 2017